This is a list of Croatian television related events from 2009.

Events
5 January - Adnan Babajić from Bosnia and Herzegovina wins the first season of Operacija Trijumf.
17 April - The new Croatian Idol, under the title of Hrvatska traži zvijezdu debuts on RTL.
19 June - Bojan Jambrošić wins the first season of Hrvatska traži zvijezdu.
18 December - 15-year-old baton twirler Tihomir Bendelja wins the first season of Supertalent.
19 December - Singer and winner of the first season of Showtime Franka Batelić and her partner Ištvan Varga win the fourth season of Ples sa zvijezdama.

Debuts
17 April - Hrvatska traži zvijezdu (2009-2011)
25 September - Supertalent (2009-2011, 2016–present)

Television shows

2000s
Ples sa zvijezdama (2006-2013)

Ending this year
Operacija Trijumf (2008-2009)

Births

Deaths

See also
2009 in Croatia